Lucas de Souza Ventura  (born 19 May 1998), known as Lucas Ventura or sometimes as Nonoca, is a Brazilian professional footballer who plays as a defensive midfielder for Portimonense.

Professional career
Lucas Ventura was recruited by Cruzeiro Youth Team in 2014, while playing a tournament in his native city. In 2017, Cruzeiro's coach Mano Menezes promoted him to the senior squad. On April 9, 2017, Nonoca made his professional debut in the match against Democrata-GV at Campeonato Mineiro. 

When Lucas Ventura was promoted to Cruzeiro's First Team, he was convinced by his staff and family to use the name Lucas Ventura, but decided to change back to his nickname in June 2017, defending he was always known as Nonoca by Cruzeiro's colleagues and staff, since he was a kid growing up on the junior team. Nonoca participated well in several games in 2017, getting regular call-ups and being regularly used as a sub for Cruzeiro's defensive midfielders.

International career
Lucas Ventura was called for Brazil U17 in 2014.

References

External links
Cruzeiro profile 

1998 births
Living people
Brazilian footballers
Brazilian expatriate footballers
Campeonato Brasileiro Série A players
Campeonato Brasileiro Série B players
Campeonato Brasileiro Série C players
Primeira Liga players
Cruzeiro Esporte Clube players
Sport Club do Recife players
Boa Esporte Clube players
Avaí FC players
Portimonense S.C. players
Association football midfielders
Expatriate footballers in Portugal
Brazilian expatriate sportspeople in Portugal